Marcello Ives de Ridder Perrier (7 June 1922 – 7 January 1973) was an Argentinian bobsledder who competed in the late 1940s. At the 1948 Winter Olympics in St. Moritz, he finished 12th in the four-man and 15th in the two-man events.

References

External links
 

1922 births
1973 deaths
Argentine male bobsledders
Olympic bobsledders of Argentina
Bobsledders at the 1948 Winter Olympics
Argentine people of Dutch descent